Asian One Air, formerly known as PT Mimika Air and GT Air (Germania Trisila Air) is a charter airline based in Jakarta, Indonesia. It was established in 1998 and operates charter services for Djayanti, an Indonesian forestry company. Its main base is Halim Perdanakusuma Airport, Jakarta.

History
GT Air was established in 1998. Its official name is Germania Trisila Air.  From November 2004 to mid-2006, GT Air operated scheduled flights between Denpasar (Bali) and Lombok.

In 2006, a DHC-6 Twin Otter was chartered to transport aid workers to Aceh and North Sumatra provinces in the aftermath of the 2004 Indian Ocean earthquake. In July 2007, the Directorate General of Civil Aviation revoked the Air Operator's Certificate of Germania Trisila Air, along with another eight Indonesian airlines citing safety concern.

In 2019 the airline was rebranded as Asian One Air.

Fleet
As of August 2006, the Asian One Air fleet comprised the following aircraft:

Accidents and incidents
On 23 February 2005, DHC-6 Twin Otter PK-LTY of GT Air struck a fence on landing at Enarotali Airport on a flight from Timika.
On 12 April 2005, DHC-6 Twin Otter PK-LTZ of GT Air crashed near Enarotali while on a flight from Timika to Enarotali while on a scheduled passenger flight. The wreckage was not discovered until 17 April. All three crew and fourteen passengers were killed.
On 17 April 2009, Mimika Air Flight 514, operated by Pilatus PC-6 PK-LTJ crashed into Mount Gergaji, Papua killing all ten people on board.

References

External links

Defunct airlines of Indonesia
Airlines established in 1998
Indonesian companies established in 1998
2007 disestablishments in Indonesia
Airlines disestablished in 2007